The 1982 Giro d'Italia was the 65th edition of the Giro d'Italia, one of cycling's Grand Tours. The Giro began in Milan, with a prologue team time trial on 13 May, and Stage 11 occurred on 25 May with a stage to Camigliatello Silano, followed by a rest day. The race finished in Turin on 6 June.

Prologue
13 May 1982 — Milan,  (TTT)

Stage 1
14 May 1982 — Parma to Viareggio,

Stage 2
15 May 1982 — Viareggio to Cortona,

Stage 3
16 May 1982 — Perugia to Assisi,  (ITT)

Stage 4
17 May 1982 — Assisi to Rome,

Stage 5
18 May 1982 — Rome to Caserta,

Stage 6
19 May 1982 — Caserta to Castellammare di Stabia,

Stage 7
20 May 1982 — Castellammare di Stabia to Diamante,

Rest day 1
21 May 1982

Stage 8
22 May 1982 — Taormina to Agrigento,

Stage 9
23 May 1982 — Agrigento to Palermo,

Stage 10
24 May 1982 — Cefalù to Messina,

Stage 11
25 May 1982 — Palmi to Camigliatello Silano,

Rest day 2
26 May 1982

References

1982 Giro d'Italia
Giro d'Italia stages